Deepchand Laxmichand Gothi was an Indian politician from the state of the Madhya Pradesh.
He represented Betul Vidhan Sabha constituency of the undivided Madhya Pradesh Legislative Assembly by winning the 1957 Madhya Pradesh Legislative Assembly election.

References 

Year of birth missing
Possibly living people
Madhya Pradesh MLAs 1957–1962
People from Betul, Madhya Pradesh
Madhya Pradesh MLAs 1952–1957
Madhya Pradesh MLAs 1962–1967
Indian National Congress politicians from Madhya Pradesh